Criticism of monarchy can be targeted against the general form of government—monarchy—or more specifically, to particular monarchical governments as controlled by hereditary royal families. In some cases, this criticism can be curtailed by legal restrictions and be considered criminal speech, as in lèse-majesté. Monarchies in Europe and their underlying concepts, such as the Divine Right of Kings, were often criticized during the Age of Enlightenment, which notably paved the way to the French Revolution and the proclamation of the abolition of the monarchy in France. Earlier, the American Revolution had seen the Patriots suppress the Loyalists and expel all royal officials. In this century, monarchies are present in the world in many forms with different degrees of royal power and involvement in civil affairs:
 Absolute monarchies in Brunei, Oman, Qatar, Saudi Arabia, Eswatini, the United Arab Emirates, and the Vatican City;
 Constitutional monarchies in the United Kingdom and its sovereign's Commonwealth Realms, and in Belgium, Denmark, Japan, Liechtenstein, Luxembourg, Malaysia, Monaco, The Netherlands, Norway, Spain, Sweden, Thailand, and others.

The twentieth century, beginning with the 1917 February Revolution in Russia and accelerated by two world wars, saw many European countries replace their monarchies with republics, while others replaced their absolute monarchies with constitutional monarchies. Reverse movements have also occurred, with brief returns of the monarchy in France under the Bourbon Restoration, the July Monarchy, and the Second French Empire, the Stuarts after the English Civil War and the Bourbons in Spain after the Franco dictatorship.

Criticism of existing monarchies

The selection of sovereigns generally does not involve democratic principles, such as in elective monarchy in states they head. For hereditary monarchies, royal power transmission is carried from generation to generation, with the title and associated power passing down to an heir. Several royal families are criticized in the world and their legitimacy challenged for example:

Bahrain

The Bahraini protests were initially aimed at achieving greater political freedom and equality for the majority Shia population, and expanded to a call to end the monarchy of Hamad bin Isa Al Khalifa following a deadly night raid on 17 February 2011 against protesters at the Pearl Roundabout in Manama, known locally as Bloody Thursday.

Belgium
A Belgian association, the Republican Circle, launched the petition "Abolition of Monarchy in Europe" to the attention of the European Parliament in March 2008, highlighting what they perceive as the incompatibility of the monarchy with several international declarations: Universal Declaration of Human Rights, International Covenant on Civil and Political Rights, and the Charter of Fundamental Rights of the European Union.

Canada

Debate between monarchists and republicans in Canada has been taking place since before the country's Confederation in 1867. Republican action has taken the form of protests on Victoria Day, the former Canadian sovereign's official birthday, lobbying of the federal and provincial governments to eliminate Canadian royal symbols, and legal action against the Crown, specifically in relation to the Oath of Citizenship and the Act of Settlement 1701. The debate has historically been stronger in the French-speaking province of Québec, in which a substantial sovereignty movement exists against both the federation of Canada and its Crown.

Japan

Morocco

The legitimacy of King Mohammed VI was contested by some in the February 20 Movement of 2011 that attempted to challenge the monarchic system for the first time in the modern history   of this country.

Netherlands

Norway

Saudi Arabia

In August 2012, the Swedish Defense Minister Karin Enström said that Saudi Arabia could be called a dictatorship. There have been protests against the royal dictatorship of the Al Saud family and calls for prisoners held without charge or trial to be released. In early 2012, protestors chanted slogans against the House of Saud and Minister of Interior Nayef, calling Nayef a "terrorist", "criminal" and "butcher”.

Spain

Sweden

Thailand

United Kingdom

The issue of the monarchy of the United Kingdom has been a contentious issue within the United Kingdom and the countries that make up the union for hundreds of years. Arguments against the UK monarchy include the institution’s unaccountability, that appointing a head of state using the hereditary principle is undemocratic, unfair and elitist and should instead be decided by democratic elections, the monarchy's expense, the fact that the UK monarchy still holds royal prerogative which grants the Prime Minister powers such as the ability to declare war or sign treaties without a vote in Parliament, the Privy Council (a body of advisors to the monarch) being able to enact legislation without a vote in Parliament etc.

See also
Abolition of monarchy
Democratization
Republicanism

References

External links

 Charter of Fundamental Rights of the European Union (and in PDF format).
 Charter of Fundamental Rights of the European Union as adapted at Lisbon
 Charter of Human Rights
 European Parliament’s explanation of the Charter of Fundamental Rights
 Petition to the European Parliament (for abolition of monarchy).
 Universal Declaration of Human Rights (Overview)
  UDHR (Official translations)

Monarchy
Criticisms by ideology